T. K. Chidambaranatha Mudaliar (1882–1954) was a Tamil scholar from Tenkasi. He was one of the founding authors of Tamil renaissance movement. He had authored Tamil books and Kambar Tharum Ramayanam. He was popularly known as "Rasigamani". He was A member of Madras Presidency Legislative council in 1927. (Diarchy in Madras Presidency)

References

Tamil scholars
1882 births
1954 deaths
Writers in British India